Ernest zu Hohenlohe (5 August 1891 – 17 June 1947) was an Austrian fencer. He competed in the individual sabre event at the 1912 Summer Olympics.

References

External links
 

1891 births
1947 deaths
Austrian male sabre fencers
Olympic fencers of Austria
Fencers at the 1912 Summer Olympics
People from Racibórz
People from the Province of Silesia